Hannes Hanso (born 6 October 1971) is an Estonian politician and diplomat, a former member of the Estonian Social Democratic Party. Hanso was the Minister of Defence in Taavi Rõivas' cabinet from September 2015 to November 2016.

Early life
Hanso graduated from Orissaare Gymnasium and studied special needs education and law in the University of Tartu, the Chinese language in Sichuan University, and transport management in Ealing, Hammersmith and West London College. Hanso has also studied politics and development studies in the School of Oriental and African Studies (SOAS) and acquired his MA in Asian politics in 2005. From 1998 to 2005, Hanso worked as a freelance correspondent for the Eesti Rahvusringhääling and Radio Free Europe.

Political career
From 2005–2007, Hanso served as the Adviser to the International Cooperation Department of the Ministry of Defence and from 2007–2009, as the Adviser to the Minister of Finance.

Hanso was in the diplomatic service of the European Union in China and Mongolia from 2009 to 2011. He worked as a researcher at the International Centre for Defence and Security from 2011–2013 and was the Mayor of Kuressaare from 2013–2015.

In 2015, Hannes Hanso was a Member of the 13th Riigikogu and performed the duties of the Chairman of the Foreign Affairs Committee.

On 14 September 2015, Hanso became the Minister of Defence in Taavi Rõivas' second cabinet.

References

External links
Hannes Hanso at the Government of Estonia site valitsus.ee

1971 births
Living people
People from Nõo Parish
Social Democratic Party (Estonia) politicians
Defence Ministers of Estonia
Members of the Riigikogu, 2015–2019
Mayors of Kuressaare
University of Tartu alumni